Emanuel Schlechter (pseudonyms Eman, Olgierd Lech) (Emanuel Szlechter) (9 October 1904 – 1943) was born and died in Lwów. He was a Polish-Jewish artist, lyricist, screenwriter, librettist, writer, satirist, translator, composer and director.

His father was a house painter in Lwów. The family name of his mother was Begeleiter. Emanuel's brother was Emil Henryk Szlechter (1906-1995), an expert in the laws of Sumeria, Babylonia and Assyria. When Szlechter was 14 years old, he joined the Małopolskie Oddziały Armii Ochotniczej (Lesser Poland's Volunteer Army) and during summer 1920 he participated in the defense of Lwów.

After passing his matura exam around 1923 he studied law at the Jan Kazimierz University in Lwów and worked briefly in a law firm. His earliest lyrics were written for Leon Borunski's songs, staged at the Morskie Oko theater's Parada gwiazd show in 1930, performed and recorded by Syrena Rekord star Kazimierz Krukowski.

Musical career
In 1931, Schlechter created the Lwów Academic Theatre Złoty pieprzyk (Golden mole). One of his first revues, Co słychać w wielkim świecie (What's going on in the big world) included his first hit song, Żołnierska brać. He performed as a singer in the Lwów cafes of Musa and Roma, accompanied by the pianist Julius Gabla. He also wrote columns for newspapers.

Around 1932, he moved permanently to Warsaw. In 1933, he wrote the screenplay and songs for the first Polish film operetta Każdemu wolno kochać (Everyone is allowed to love), directed by Mieczysław Krawicz. He worked at the Rex theater writing songs, revues, sketches, scenarios, satirical songs and monologues. Between 1933 and 1935 he recorded as a singer and guitarist, as himself or using the nickname of Olgierd Lech. He made a series of "Jewish" records including like Awremałe (Avremele), Śpiewak sobotni, Rabi Eli-Melech (Rabbi Elimelech), Alef Bet (Oyfn Pripetchok), and Żydowskie wesele (Yidishe khasene). One of the most popular songs by Schlechter was Srulek. He worked with the Columbia and Odeon orchestras. In 1934 he wrote for La Bohème theater, collaborating with Konrad Tom.

He wrote lyrics of many songs featured in Polish pre-war films including Parada rezerwistów, Kobiety na sprzedaż, Trójka hultajska, Kocha, lubi, szanuje, Czy Lucyna to dziewczyna?, Co mój mąż robi w nocy, Jaśnie pan szofer, Dodek na froncie, Jego wielka miłość, Skłamałam, Książątko, Wyrok życia, Robert i Bertranda, and Czarna perła. He wrote screenplays of Antek policmajster (with Konrad Tom and Michał Waszyński), Będzie lepiej (with Ludwik Starski and Michał Waszyński), Jadzia (with Karol Jarossy and Mieczysław Krawicz), Ja tu rządzę (with Ludwik Starski and Mieczysław Krawicz), Królowa przedmieścia (with Jerzy Nel and Eugeniusz Bodo), Piętro wyżej (with Ludwik Starski, Eugeniusz Bodo, and Leon Trystan), Szczęśliwa trzynastka (with Ludwik Starski, Aleksander Pękalski, and Marian Czauski), and Włóczęgi (with Konrad Tom and Michał Waszyński).

Starting in 1935 he worked with the Cyrulik Warszawski and Małe Qui pro Quo theaters.

Some of his hits included:
 Umówiłem się z nią na dziewiątą (I Have a Date with Her at Nine), music by Henryk Wars,
 Sex-appeal, music by Henryk Wars,
 Nie ja—nie ty! (Neither me, nor you!), music by Henryk Gold, sung by Schlechter himself,
 Nic o tobie nie wiem... (I Know Nothing About You), music by Henryk Gold, sung by Mieczysław Fogg,
 Co bez miłości wart jest świat  with Konrad Tom, music by Henryk Wars,
 Ty i ja (You And I) with Fred Scher,
 Ja mam czas, ja poczekam (I have time, I can wait) music by Mieczysław Mierzejewski,
 Odrobinę szczęścia w miłości (A bit of luck with love), music by Jerzy Petersburski sung by Stefan Witas,
 Młodym być i więcej nic (To be young and nothing more), music by Jerzy Petersburski, Ivo Wesby orchestra

Death
In September 1939, during the German and Soviet invasion of Poland Schlechter was working at the Lwów Teatr Miniatura as an actor, writer and director. He was known for his anti-Nazi satires.

However, after the Germans occupied Lwów in 1941 during Operation Barbarossa, Schlechter was sent to the Lviv ghetto. He was then transferred to the Janowska concentration camp where he was part of its artistic life, participating in literary evenings. 
Schlechter most likely died in Janowska in 1942, along with his wife and young son, although it is possible that he managed to survive until 1943.

Filmography

Screenplays
 Parada rezerwistów (1934)
 Co mój mąż robi w nocy? (1934)
 Antek policmajster (1935)
 Amerykańska awantura (1936)
 Bedzie lepiej (1936)
 Jadzia (1936)
 Królowa przedmieścia (1937)
 Kochaj tylko mnie (1937)
 Strachy (1938)
 Szczesliwa 13-ka (1938)
 Robert and Bertram (1938)
 Piętro wyżej (1938)
 Serce matki (1938)
 Ja tu rządzę (1939)Wlóczegi'' (1939)

Dialogues
Wyrok życia (1933)
Każdemu wolno kochać (1933)
Czy Lucyna to dziewczyna (1934)
Jaśnie pan szofer (1935)
Jego wielka miłość (1935)
Dodek na froncie (1936)
Będzie lepiej (1936)
Królowa przedmieścia (1937)
Robert i Bertrand (1938)

Films with his song lyrics
Czarna perła (1934)
Kochaj tylko mnie (1937)
Piętro wyżej (1938)

References

Bibliography
 A. Redzik, Jak twórca szlagierów wszech czasów nie został adwokatem – rzecz o Emanuelu Schlechterze (1904–1943). W 110. rocznicę urodzin i 70. rocznicę śmierci, „Palestra” 2014, nr 1–2, s. 245–255.
 A. Redzik, Emil Henryk Szlechter (1906–1995) – w dwudziestą rocznicę śmierci, "Palestra" 2015, nr 1–2, s. 216.

External links
 
  Music by Henryk Wars, sung by Tadeusz Olsza

1904 births
1943 deaths
Jewish cabaret performers
Musicians from Lviv
Polish cabaret performers
Jewish composers
Jewish songwriters
People who died in the Lwów Ghetto
20th-century Polish male singers
20th-century comedians
20th-century Polish screenwriters
Male screenwriters
20th-century Polish male writers
People from the Kingdom of Galicia and Lodomeria
Austro-Hungarian Jews
Jews from Galicia (Eastern Europe)
Film people from Lviv
Child soldiers
Polish Jews who died in the Holocaust